Pyrgota is a genus of flies in the family Pyrgotidae. There are about 10 described species in Pyrgota.

Species
These 10 species belong to the genus Pyrgota:
 Pyrgota dichaetus (Steyskal, 1978)
 Pyrgota fenestrata (Macquart, 1851)
 Pyrgota ilona Aczel, 1956
 Pyrgota longipes Hendel, 1908
 Pyrgota lugens Wulp, 1898
 Pyrgota maculipennis (Macquart, 1846)
 Pyrgota nelsoni Kondratieff & Fitzgerald, 1993
 Pyrgota shewelli (Steyskal, 1978)
 Pyrgota undata Wiedemann, 1830 (waved light fly)
 Pyrgota valida (Harris, 1841)

References

Further reading

External links

 

Pyrgotidae
Articles created by Qbugbot
Schizophora genera